Babarino is a rural locality (a village) in Seletskoye Rural Settlement, Suzdalsky District, Vladimir Oblast, Russia. The population was 3 as of 2010.

Geography 
Babarino is located on the left bank of the Nerl River, 16 km southeast of Suzdal (the district's administrative centre) by road. Pereborovo is the nearest rural locality.

References 

Rural localities in Suzdalsky District